, is a women's football team which plays in Division 1 of Japan's Nadeshiko League. As the strongest women's club in the Tōkai region, it has made a niche for itself against the more resourceful powers of the Kanto, NTV Beleza, and Kansai, INAC Kobe Leonessa.

Squad

Current squad

Honors

Domestic competitions
Nadeshiko.League Division 1
Champions (2) : 1995, 1999, 2021
Runners-up (2) : 1996, 2000, 2022
Empress's Cup All-Japan Women's Football Tournament
Champions (3) : 1995, 1998, 2001
Runners-up (4) : 1993, 1994, 1997, 1999
Nadeshiko League Cup
Champions (2) : 1997, 1998
Runners-up (2) : 1996, 1999

Results

Transition of team name
Iga-Ueno Kunoichi SC : 1976 - 1988
Prima Ham FC Kunoichi : 1989 - 1999
Iga FC Kunoichi : 2000 – 2019
Iga FC Kunoichi Mie : 2020 – Present

Home ground

References

External links 
 Iga Football Club Kunoichi official site
 Japanese Club Teams

Women's football clubs in Japan
1976 establishments in Japan
Sports teams in Mie Prefecture
Japan Women's Football League teams
Association football clubs established in 1976